Berlin Raceway is a 7/16 mile long paved oval race track in Marne, Michigan, United States, near Grand Rapids. The track races weekly as part of the NASCAR Advance Auto Parts Weekly Series. It has also held touring series events on the ARCA Menards Series, ARCA Menards Series East, American Speed Association National Tour, USAC Stock Cars, USAC Silver Crown, World of Outlaws Sprint cars, and World of Outlaws Late Model Series tours.

The track opened in 1950. It was originally a horse track before World War II. Berlin's current track record is 12.513 seconds, set by Brian Gerster in 2018 in a winged sprint car. Berlin Raceway takes its name from the city of Marne's original name "Berlin," which was changed due to Anti-German sentiment following World War I.

History
The track was developed by the Chester Mysliwiec family in 1950. It was purchased by the West Michigan Whitecaps in 2001. The group made numerous improvements to the facilities such as new bathrooms, updated catch fences, and a new sound system. Dirt was temporarily placed over the pavement after the 2017 regular season and three touring series visited the track in September / October - American Ethanol Late Model Tour, American Ethanol Modified Tour and Engine Pro Sprints On Dirt. Some racing scenes for the movie God Bless the Broken Road were recorded at the track in early 2016 for the 2018 film. The track dropped its Super Stock and Modified classes in 2020 and added a class of Limited Late Models. Other classes include Super Late Models, Sportsman, 4 Cylinder, and Mini-Wedges. Berlin Raceway won the 2021 Advance Auto Parts 'Advance My Track Challenge' $50,000 award beating out Hudson Speedway in New Hampshire and Alaska Raceway Park. 

Some drivers that have come from the track are Jack Sprague, Tim Steele, 1967 track champion Bob Senneker, and 2017 Super Late Model track champion Carson Hocevar. 1989 track Outlaw Late Model champion Johnny Benson Jr. described the track as "one of the most difficult tracks in the country." The track has a 13-degree banking in turns and 9-degree banking on the straightaways. The track is notable for the lack of an outside wall on the back straightaway, a rare feature for a track featuring national series races. In addition, the short straights make it feel almost circular.

ARCA winners

Reference: 

August 2, 1986	Bob Keselowski
July 10, 1999	Frank Kimmel
July 15, 2000	Tim Steele
September 22, 2001 Tim Steele
July 20, 2002 Fred Campbell
May 24, 2003 Frank Kimmel
July 3, 2004 Frank Kimmel
July 16, 2005 Joey Miller
July 15, 2006 Brian Keselowski
July 7, 2007 Brian Keselowski
July 26, 2008 Scott Speed
July 25, 2009 Justin Lofton
August 7, 2010 Joey Coulter
July 9, 2011 Matt Merrell
August 11, 2012 Chris Buescher
August 10, 2013 Erik Jones
August 9, 2014	Grant Enfinger
August 8, 2015 Grant Enfinger
August 6, 2016	Dalton Sargeant
July 21, 2018 Joe Graf Jr.
July 17, 2021 Daniel Dye
June 18, 2022 Sammy Smith

American Speed Association Winners
Bob Senneker won seven ASA National tour races at the track. Other winners on the ASA National tour starting in 1998 include:

June 13, 1998 Gary St. Amant
August 2, 1998 Scott Hansen
June 5, 1999 Mike Miller
August 14, 1999 Mike Miller
July 14, 2001 Butch Miller
June 1, 2002 Butch Miller
August 2, 2003 Peter Cozzolino
June 12, 2004 Mike Eddy

ARCA Menards Series East Winners
One race held in 2017 under the NASCAR K&N Pro Series East 
July 1, 2017 Todd Gilliland

NASCAR Grand National East Series Winners
One race held in 1973 called the Coca Cola 100
August 17, 1973 Bob Senneker

References

External links
 Speedway website
 
 Berlin Raceway race results at The Third Turn

Motorsport venues in Michigan
NASCAR tracks
ARCA Menards Series tracks
Sports venues in Ottawa County, Michigan
1950 establishments in Michigan
Sports venues completed in 1950